Jelle Vanendert (born 19 February 1985) is a Belgian former professional road racing cyclist, who last rode for UCI ProTeam . He competed in a total of ten Grand Tours during his career. His younger brother Dennis Vanendert also competed professionally with the  team between 2012 and 2015.

Career
In 2011, Vanendert showed good form at La Flèche Wallonne, where he came sixth. He rode the Tour de France initially as the main climbing domestique for Jurgen Van den Broeck. However, when his leader crashed out of the race, Vanendert was given a free role, and on Stage 14 attacked from the group of GC contenders to win the stage. Vanendert finished 20th overall and also wore the King of the Mountains Jersey.

In August 2021, Vanendert announced that he would retire from competition at the end of the season.

Major results

2004
 8th Circuit de Wallonie
2005
 4th Flèche Ardennaise
2006
 1st Grand Prix de Waregem
 1st Stage 2 Ronde de l'Isard
 3rd Overall Giro delle Regioni
 5th Road race, UCI Under-23 Road World Championships
 5th Circuit de Wallonie
 7th Road race, UEC European Under-23 Road Championships
 7th Grand Prix de Wallonie
 10th Druivenkoers Overijse
2007
 1st De Vlaamse Pijl
 5th Beverbeek Classic
 8th Grand Prix de Wallonie
 9th Hel van het Mergelland
2009
 6th Eschborn–Frankfurt City Loop
 9th Overall Tour of Austria
2011
 Tour de France
1st Stage 14
Held  after Stages 14–19
 6th La Flèche Wallonne
 9th Clásica de San Sebastián
2012
 2nd Amstel Gold Race
 4th La Flèche Wallonne
 7th Brabantse Pijl
 10th Liège–Bastogne–Liège
 10th Grote Prijs Jef Scherens
2014
 2nd Amstel Gold Race
 4th Grand Prix de Wallonie
 6th La Flèche Wallonne
 6th Clásica de San Sebastián
 8th Druivenkoers Overijse
2015
 5th Grand Prix de Wallonie
2016
 4th Overall Tour de Wallonie
 5th Halle–Ingooigem
 7th Druivenkoers Overijse
2017
 4th Overall Tour de Wallonie
 7th Grand Prix de Wallonie
2018
 2nd Overall Tour of Belgium
1st Stage 4
 3rd La Flèche Wallonne
 4th Grand Prix de Wallonie
 10th Amstel Gold Race
2019
 7th Clásica de San Sebastián
 9th La Flèche Wallonne

General classification results timeline

Classics results timeline

References

External links

Belgian male cyclists
Living people
1985 births
Belgian Tour de France stage winners
People from Neerpelt
2011 Tour de France stage winners
Cyclists from Limburg (Belgium)